Re Welch (1990] NZPC 4; [1990] UKPC 30; [1990] 3 NZLR 1; (1990) 7 FRNZ 536 is a cited case in New Zealand law regarding claims under the Law Reform (Testamentary Promises) Act 1949.

References

1990 in New Zealand law